The 2017 season was Western Storm's second season, in which they competed in the Women's Cricket Super League, a Twenty20 competition. The side finished third in the initial group stage, therefore progressing to the semi-final, where they beat Surrey Stars by three wickets. In the final, they faced Southern Vipers in a repeat of the previous season's final. This time, however, Western Storm were victorious by seven wickets to claim their first title.

The side was captained by Heather Knight and coached by the newly appointed Trevor Griffin. They played one of their home matches at the County Ground, Taunton and their other home match at the County Ground, Bristol.

Squad
Western Storm's 15-player squad for the season is listed below. Age given is at the start of Western Storm's first match of the season (10 August 2017).

Women's Cricket Super League

Season standings

 Advanced to the Final.
 Advanced to the Semi-final.

League stage

Semi-final

Final

Statistics

Batting

Bowling

Fielding

Wicket-keeping

References

Western Storm seasons
2017 in English women's cricket